Stollwerck GmbH is a German chocolate manufacturer. It was founded in 1839 and expanded internationally in Europe and America, becoming the second largest producer of chocolate in the United States by 1900. Since 2011 it has belonged to Belgian firm Baronie Group.

History

From beginnings until the Second World War

In 1839 the baker Franz Stollwerck started business in Cologne, Germany. He diversified into chocolate and other candy, having particular success with cough drops. Local pharmacists requested that he be prevented from selling such medicinal items in 1845, but this was rejected. His business flourished in Germany and also he opened two coffee houses in Cologne. One of these was briefly converted into a music hall before becoming a chocolate and candy factory in the 1860s. In 1871 his sons registered a separate company Gebrüder Stollwerck (Stollwerck Brothers) which merged back into the original company in 1876, after the death of Franz Stollwerck.
 

Stollwerck's five sons expanded the business into a multinational corporation with plants in Europe and America. The second youngest of the brothers, Ludwig Stollwerck was instrumental in introducing new technology including the first vending machines in 1887. These were initially used to sell small samples of chocolate, but their immediate popularity meant they were soon used to sell entire bars. In 1893 Stollwerck was selling its chocolate in 15,000 vending machines. It set up separate companies in various territories to manufacture vending machines to sell not just chocolate, but cigarettes, matches, chewing gum and soap products. By 1890 its Cologne works alone had 1500 staff. 
 
Stollwerck turned their focus to exporting their products. Subsidiaries were formed in England, Belgium and Austria-Hungary. In 1894 Stollwerck founded Volkmann, Stollwerck & Company in the USA, in partnership  with German businessman John Volkmann to produce vending machines in their factory in New York. By the early 1890s there were over 4,000 of its vending machines on New York train stations. It also became a leading manufacturer of cinematographs. In 1902 the company went public, but World War I brought Stollwerck's rapid expansion to a halt.
 
In 1927 Karl Stollwerck built the Stollwerck Mausoleum in Upper Bavaria, a rare combination of Protestant church and family burial chamber.

Costly acquisitions and the global economic downturn of the Great Depression devastated Stollwerck's finances. It had to be rescued by the Deutsche Bank in the 1930s, which marked the end of its family ownership.

In the Second World War food rationing and the scarcity of cocoa drastically reduced the firm's market.

From the Post Second World War period to the present
After the Second World War the firm was left with damaged factories and much of its manufacturing equipment expropriated as reparations. It restarted production in 1949 and fared moderately in the face of intense competition in the 1950s and 1960s. Its finances worsened until 1972, when Hans Imhoff bought the company and guided it to great success as a chocolate manufacturer with plants in West Germany and abroad, directly competing with long-established brands such as Sarotti.
 
After the reunification of Germany, Stollwerck quickly invested in the former East Germany, buying the Thuringian Chocolate Factory GmbH in Saalfeld, makers of Rotstern brand chocolate and the German Democratic Republic's  largest chocolate producer.

Stollwerck opened a chocolate factory in Székesfehérvár, Hungary in 1995 and became the market leader. It achieved similar success in Poland and Russia.

In 1993 the Imhoff-Stollwerck chocolate museum was opened in Rheinauhafen, Cologne to exhibit items from Stollwerck's history and the history and science of chocolate making.

In 1998 Stollwerck acquired Sarotti from Nestlé.

In 2001 Hans Imhoff retired and Stollwerck sold its Eastern European subsidiaries to Kraft Foods.

In 2002 Stollwerck was sold to Barry Callebaut AG, the world's largest chocolate company, who bought back its public shares and ceased production at the parent factory in Cologne, just leaving administrative functions there.

In 2011 Barry Callebaut sold Stollwerck to the Baronie Group of Veurne, Belgium.  At that time, Stollwerck had five factories in Belgium, Germany and Switzerland; it employed 1700 staff and its annual production was around 100,000 tonnes of chocolate.

See also 
 Imhoff-Schokoladenmuseum the Cologne Chocolate Museum
 List of bean-to-bar chocolate manufacturers

References

External links 

 Stollwerck.de (ger.)
 

Manufacturing companies based in Cologne
German chocolate companies
German brands
Purveyors to the Imperial and Royal Court